Education reform has been a topic for Kentucky government officials and citizens for over 20 years.  The most significant piece of reform legislation was passed in 1990, and was known as the Kentucky Education Reform Act (KERA).  This act instituted six basic initiatives, some of the most important being a focus on core subjects, community service, and self-sufficiency.  Kentucky education has seen improvements in terms of equalizing funding among various schools, but still has a long way to go in becoming nationally competitive in its educational outcomes and standardized test scores.

Voluntary charter schools 

	One viable reform option that has gotten little attention is the possibility of voluntary  charter schools, especially in areas of poor public school opportunities.  The U.S. Department of Education defines charter schools as “tuition-free public schools freed from regulation in exchange for greater accountability.”    In the charter school system, individual schools and administrations have more control over the structure of various curricula and school programs which provides for a more tailored emphasis for each student.  And, by and large, students and parents felt that the students “{received} more individualized attention at the charter school than they did at their previous school.”    These same parents said that they felt their students were able to learn more efficiently because teachers were more able to adapt their methods to fit the child’s individual learning style.

Another benefit of charter schools is their effect on the competitiveness of the education market.  Recent research conducted by the U.S. Department of Education proves that voluntary charter schools will provide greater educational choices and help to create a more competitive educational market that encourages all schools to improve.  The Department of Education’s research shows that the creation and inclusion of charter schools in school systems led to visible improvements in the test scores and student behaviors of almost every school in that school system, whether they were public, private, charter, or anything else.

Advanced placement classes 

	Voluntary charter schools certainly provide one aspect to bettering the educational system in Kentucky.  But while charter schools benefit students by creating a more competitive educational marketplace, one still needs to consider how to institute reform that better prepares Kentucky students for post-secondary education, should they choose to pursue it.  One of the ways that absolutely every school in Kentucky can improve its educational standards is with the greater inclusion of advanced placement (or AP) classes.  Advanced placement classes are those with a higher degree of difficulty that seek to prepare high school students for post-secondary education.  One college admissions website says that some of the reasons AP classes are important are because they impress college admissions offices, help better prepare students for college-level curriculum, and help students to make better decisions after high school.
   
With a proven record of helping to better prepare students for post-secondary education, AP classes are being discussed more and more by Kentucky high school teachers and administrators.  This open dialogue about AP classes is extremely important as current data from Western Kentucky University’s Center of Gifted Studies reveal that “college students who have not taken an AP course have only a 33 percent chance of completing a bachelor’s degree.”     But, that success rate increases exponentially with the inclusion of AP courses in Kentucky students’ high school educations.  The Center of Gifted Studies reports that “College students who have completed one AP course have a 59 percent chance of completing a four-year degree, while students with two or more AP courses under their belt have a 76 percent chance of completing a bachelor’s degree” (Switzer).

Research institutes aren't the only entities supporting the greater inclusion of AP courses in high school curricula though; in fact, some of the biggest advocates for an increased number of AP courses are the teachers who would be charged with leading said classes.  Vicki Schmitt, an AP English and literature teacher at Greenwood High School in Bowling Green, Kentucky, believes that AP courses are the very best way to prepare students for a college education (Switzer).  On the benefits of AP classes for both the students and teachers, Schmitt said, “AP helps teachers teach kids how to think.  Students tell me there was not a class in high school that prepared them for college except for their AP classes” (Switzer).  At Greenwood High School, where Schmitt has taught for the past 12 years, there are currently 14 AP classes offered for students.  However, that number is much higher than the vast majority of Kentucky schools, and there is much more work to be done to make Kentucky public schools look more like Greenwood High School.  Based on the research provided and the opinions of many teachers like Schmitt, it seems that if more schools were to include AP options in their programs, Kentucky students would be more ready for post-secondary education, and become more successful members of society.

Greater authority for local school superintendents 

	Another form of education reform that may require legislative action is the granting of greater authority to superintendents. One of the effects of the Kentucky Education Reform Act of 1990 was the creation of “site-based councils at each school . . . {which} generally consists of the principal, three teachers and two parents.”     These site-based councils would be charged with the hiring of all new principals for whatever school it represented. But Wilson Sears, executive director of the Kentucky Association of School Superintendents, believes that KERA’s reliance on these site-based councils to hire principals is misplaced. Instead, Sears believes that superintendents should have the responsibility of hiring principals, and he has lobbied tirelessly for the recently passed Kentucky Senate Bill 12 which says that superintendents will temporarily replace fired principals and will also have a vote in choosing who the subsequent principal will be (Croyle). Like Sears, Campbell County Schools Superintendent Anthony Strong also thinks superintendents should have greater authority in personnel hiring.

Granting superintendents greater authority in choosing school principals is only one of the ways to increase autonomy at the local school board level.  Another means of increasing local autonomy is to give principals and school administrators greater authority over the spending of instructional funds and resources.  One 2011 Kentucky Gubernatorial candidate, David L. Williams, believes that local administrators should have greater “input on how to use the funds they are provided to ensure children are getting the best possible education.”     Williams’ assertion that principals and local school administrators should have greater power in deciding how funds are spent is supported by research by the National Governors Association’s Center for Best Practices.  NGA research proves that “Principals need discretion to direct resources in ways that match curriculum, instruction, and support services with students’ identified needs.”     This research also suggests that “decentralized budget authority is a contributing factor to school effectiveness,” primarily in high-performing, high-poverty schools (Conklin and Smith, 1).  Bearing this research in mind, it seems as if granting greater authority to local school administrators in terms of personnel hiring and budget distribution may lead to a more successful Kentucky educational system for all.

References

Education reform
Public education in Kentucky
Reform in the United States